Sinosabellidites huainanensis  part of the small shelly fauna is a species of Early Neoproterozoic metazoans.

References

Ediacaran life
Neoproterozoic
Prehistoric marine animals